Fable is a British television play, shown on 27 January 1965 as an episode of The Wednesday Play series on BBC 1. Written by John Hopkins, the play is set in a parallel totalitarian Britain where those in authority are black people, and white people are their social underdogs - a reversal of the situation in contemporary apartheid South Africa.

It was directed by Christopher Morahan and produced by James MacTaggart.

Cast
Eileen Atkins - Joan
Ronald Lacey - Len
Thomas Baptiste - Mark
Barbara Assoon - Francesca
Carmen Munroe - Lala
Keith Barron - Narrator	
Rudolph Walker - Policeman
Leo Carera - Editor
Bari Johnson - Deputy Editor
Dan Jackson - Overseer
Sally Lahee - Lilian
George Roderick - Laughton
Trevor D. Rhone - Assistant Editor
John Rapley - Michael
André Dakar - Head Of State
Frank Singuineau - Minister
Charles Hyatt - Newsreader
Thor Pierres - Secretary
Kenneth Gardnier - Interrogator

Commentary
Hopkins had anti-racist intentions in writing the play. Carmen Munroe has said that for the actors the production was a frightening experience "because suddenly you were being asked to perform the sorts of acts that were performed against you in real life". The programme's original screening, scheduled for 20 January 1965, was postponed by the BBC for one week "to avoid accentuating the colour issue" during the Leyton by-election to be held on 21 January. In an era when negative responses to immigration were very high, Audience Research at the time of the original broadcast suggested that some whites in the audience saw the role reversal as threatening and reinforced their racist views.

See also 
BabaKiueria - a 1986 Australian mockumentary about an oppressed white minority in a society dominated by Aboriginal Australians.
White Man's Burden (film) - a 1995 film about similar subject matter.
Noughts and Crosses (TV series) - a 2020 television series, based on the novels by Malorie Blackman, about similar subject matter.

References

1965 television plays
1965 in British television
Alternate history television episodes
Alternate history television series
BBC television dramas
Race-related controversies in television